Saint-Maurice Castle is a castle in the municipality of Saint-Maurice of the Canton of Valais in Switzerland.  It is a Swiss heritage site of national significance.

History
In 1476, Bern began construction of a castle in the narrow Rhone valley at Saint-Maurice.  It was completed in 1646 with the expansion of the residential buildings.  However, in 1693 a devastating fire in the town, destroyed the warehouse of the castle and much of the gunpowder that was stored there.

See also
 List of castles in Switzerland
 Château

References

Cultural property of national significance in Valais
Castles in the canton of Valais